Montauville is a commune in the Meurthe-et-Moselle department in north-eastern France.

It is the location of the French Le Pétant military cemetery, with WWI casualties of the Battle of Bois-le-Prêtre, and French WWII soldiers which died in German captivity.

See also
Communes of the Meurthe-et-Moselle department
Parc naturel régional de Lorraine

References

Communes of Meurthe-et-Moselle